The Spatsizi River is a tributary of the Stikine River, rising near Mount Gunanoot in the southeastern Spatsizi Plateau, British Columbia.

Etymology
"Spatsizi" is a phrase from the Sekani language meaning "red goat", a reference to the habit of mountain goats in the region of rolling in the red dust of a particular mountain, making their coat-hair red.

Geography
The Spatsizi River emerges near the foot of Mount Gunanoot in the Skeena Mountains of north-central British Columbia. It then flows downslope and enters Spatsizi Headwaters Provincial Park from the south. The river continues north, leaving the park to enter a broad valley in the heart of the Spatsizi Plateau. The flat-bottomed topography of the valley allows the river to meander considerably along much of its northwestward flow until it reaches the Stikine River in Stikine River Provincial Park.

See also
Spatsizi Mountain

References

Rivers of British Columbia
Stikine Country
Tributaries of the Stikine River
Cassiar Land District